Tomáš Matoušek (born June 15, 1992) is a Slovak ice hockey player who currently plays professionally in Slovakia for HC Slovan Bratislava of the Slovak Extraliga.

He participated at the 2012 World Junior Ice Hockey Championships as a member of the Slovakia men's national junior ice hockey team.

Career statistics

Regular season and playoffs

International

Awards and honors

References

External links

1992 births
Living people
HC '05 Banská Bystrica players
HC Donbass players
Sportspeople from Banská Bystrica
Slovak ice hockey forwards
HC Litvínov players
HC Slovan Bratislava players
HK Dukla Michalovce players
Slovak expatriate ice hockey players in the Czech Republic
Slovak expatriate sportspeople in Ukraine
Expatriate ice hockey players in Ukraine